Roberto Enrique Silva Pro (born 1 June 1976) is a Peruvian former professional football forward. Apart from one season in the Bundesliga for SV Werder Bremen, he spent most of his career in his native Peru and other American countries.

Club career
In his only spell outside of the Americas he played six matches for SV Werder Bremen in the 2001–2002 Bundesliga season.

International career
Roberto Silva made eleven appearances for Peru from 2001 to 2004 and scored 2 goals.

Personal life
He was quoted in an interview regarding homosexuality in football, saying "I have suspicions that there are some gays in football. Sometimes you can't help but wonder about it. I am not a gay, but if I was, or if I was a woman, which is similar, I would do David Beckham. But that's just my individual opinion."

References

External links
 
 
 

1976 births
Living people
Footballers from Lima
Association football forwards
Peruvian footballers
Peru international footballers
Peruvian Primera División players
Bundesliga players
Liga MX players
Club Alianza Lima footballers
Sporting Cristal footballers
SV Werder Bremen players
Unión de Santa Fe footballers
San Luis F.C. players
Caracas FC players
Cienciano footballers
Club Deportivo Universidad de San Martín de Porres players
C.D. Universidad Católica del Ecuador footballers
Sport Boys footballers
Peruvian expatriate footballers
Expatriate footballers in Germany
Expatriate footballers in Argentina
Expatriate footballers in Mexico
Expatriate footballers in Venezuela
Expatriate footballers in Ecuador
Peruvian expatriate sportspeople in Mexico